Zeiraphera funesta is a species of moth of the family Tortricidae. It is found in China (north-east and Guizhou) and Russia.

The larvae feed on Malus mandshurica, Malus pallasiana, Pyrus ussuriensis and Armeniaca sibirica.

References

Moths described in 1931
Eucosmini